Yunju Temple is a Buddhist temple located in Fangshan District,  southwest of Beijing and contains the world's largest collection of stone Buddhist sutra steles in the world.  Yunju Temple also contains one of only two extant woodblocks for the Chinese Buddhist Tripitaka in the world as well as rare copies of printed and manuscript Chinese Buddhist Tripitakas.  It also has many historic pagodas dating from the Tang and Liao Dynasty.

History
The exact year Yunju Temple was built is unknown; however construction started during the Northern Qi Dynasty (550 CE – 570 CE). Around 611 CE, a high priest named Jingwan (? - 639 CE) made a vow to engrave Buddhist sutras on stone steles to insure Buddhism's future survival because of the challenges Chinese Buddhism had recently faced during the anti-Buddhist campaigns of Emperor Taiwu of Northern Wei and Emperor Wu of Northern Zhou. Venerable Jingwan therefore set in motion a movement to engrave Buddhist sutras on stone steles that continued for over a thousand years; the last stone sutra stele engraved is dated to 1691 CE --- although by that time, the belief in the impending disaster of the Degenerate Age had subsided. The stone sutra steles varied in size and were engraved on both sides.  In addition to text, they were also engraved sometimes with images of Buddhas and Bodhisattvas as well as Siddhaṃ Letters.  The collection of stone sutra steles is also sometimes called the Fangshan Stone Sutra (Chinese: 房山石經).  Venerable Jingwan initially vowed to engrave the entire Tripitaka; at least ten titles still survive today. His successors continued his work.  One of them was involved in the engraving of the oldest extant copy (dated to 661 CE) of Tripitaka Master Xuanzang’s 649 CE translation of the Heart Sutra. During the Sui and Tang Dynasties, donors oftentimes determined which sutra to engrave on the stone stele; hence many sutras were engraved multiple times.  Royal patronage began in the Sui Dynasty (see below for rediscovery of Buddha relics). During the Tang Dynasty, Princess Jinxian (ca. 713 - 755 CE) petitioned Emperor Xuanzong to donate over 4,000 manuscript scrolls of the Buddhist Tripitaka and land to support Yunju Temple's engraving of stone sutra steles.  There is still a pagoda commemorating Princess Jinxian's support on the top of Fangshan mountain. During the Liao Dynasty, royal patronage attempted to complete the engraving of the incomplete Mahayana sutras and missing Mahayana titles.  Also during this time, royal patronage attempted to engrave on stone stele the entire Liao Dynasty's Khitan Tripitaka. Because the Sui and Tang Dynasty manuscripts on which the Sui and Tang Dynasty stone steles were based as well as the printed copies of the Khitan Tripitaka on which the Liao Dynasty stone sutras were based have largely disappeared, this makes the Fangshan stone sutras of Yunju Temple a rare treasure house of Buddhist sutras. Since these stone steles were engraved with an eye on fidelity to the original, they can be used to potentially correct later printed Tripitakas.  Since Venerable Jingwan's time a total of nine caves were excavated and filled with stone sutra steles, two underground depository rooms were also excavated and numerous temple halls were added and repaired.  The most famous cave is Cave No. 5 popularly known as Leiyin Cave.  This cave is opened for public viewing and is a large cave covered with stone sutra steles on four walls with an area for Buddhist ceremonies. Formerly a statue of Maitreya, the next Buddha was enshrined here but it was removed by unknown persons during the early 1940s. In the early 1940s, a significant portion of the temple was destroyed; however substantial portions have since been restored. Based on inscriptions on a stone stele found in a refreshment/rest stop pavilion donated by a Ming Dynasty Buddhist stating the presence of Buddha relics or śarīra in Leiyin Cave, on November 27, 1981, archaeologists rediscovered the flesh śarīra (of Buddha) donated by Emperor Yangdi of the Sui Dynasty dated to the 8th day of the 4th lunar month 616 CE.

Collection

There are also over 22,000 scrolls of rare printed or manuscript sutras kept at Yunju Temple.  The Ming Dynasty's Yongle Southern Tripitaka (1420 CE) and Yongle Northern Tripitaka (1440 CE) are stored here as well as individual printed sutras and manuscripts.

In total, 1,122 Buddhist sutras in 3572 volumes were produced at the temple consisting of over 14,200 stone steles engraved on both sides.

Yunju Temple also has one of only two extant complete woodblocks of the Chinese Tripitaka in the world: namely the Qianlong Tripitaka (1733).  Carved on over 77,000 blocks, it attracts a large number of visitors.

Yunju Temple also has two bone relics of the Buddha (śarīra) available for public viewing.

Layout
There were originally six halls in the temple, arranged from east to west. On both sides of the halls, there was accommodation for guests and dormitories for monks.

The temple contains a total of twelve pagodas from the Tang and Liao dynasties and three tomb pagodas from the Qing dynasty.

Notes

References

Sources

Dan Jixiang and Wang Fengjiang (Eds), 2001.  Fang Shan Yu Ju Temple Liao Jin Stone Sutras Preservation Record, No ISBN.  In Chinese. 
Lan Jifu (Ed), 1985. Supplement to the Dazangjing (Tripitaka), Taipei: Huayu Publishing Co., In Chinese. 
Lancaster, Lewis, 1996. Rock Cut Canon in China The Rock Cut Canon in China : Findings at Fang-Shan
Liao Pin and Wu Wen. The Temples of Beijing. Beijing: Foreign Languages Press, 2006.

 
Pagoda, Library Caves and Stone Tablets of sutra of Yunju Temple - UNESCO World Heritage Centre Pagoda, Library Caves and Stone Tablets of Sutra of Yunju Temple – UNESCO World Heritage Center.

Buddhist temples in Beijing
Major National Historical and Cultural Sites in Beijing
Chinese Buddhist grottoes
Chinese sculpture
Buildings and structures in Fangshan District